Remédios is a civil parish situated in along the northern coast of the municipality of Ponta Delgada in the Portuguese archipelago of the Azores.

History

The parochial church was built in 1958 by order of D. Manuel Afonso de Carvalho, bishop of Angra.

The parish was elevated to the status of civil parish two years later, in 1960, when it was de-annexed from the territory of Bretanha.

Geography
It is located in the northwestern part of the island of São Miguel, and includes the flanks of the Sete Cidades Massif, covered in laurisilva and endemic plant species to the coastal cliffs.

References

Notes

Sources
 

Parishes of Ponta Delgada